The history of tea in China is long and complex, for the Chinese have enjoyed tea for millennia. Scholars hailed the brew as a cure for a variety of ailments; the nobility considered the consumption of good tea as a mark of their status, and the common people simply enjoyed its flavour. In 2016, the discovery of the earliest known physical evidence of tea from the mausoleum of Emperor Jing of Han (d. 141 BCE) in Xi'an was announced, indicating that tea from the genus Camellia was drunk by Han dynasty emperors as early as the 2nd century BCE. Tea then became a popular drink in the Tang (618–907) and Song (960–1279) dynasties.

Historical background
According to legend, tea was first discovered by the legendary Chinese emperor and herbalist, Shennong, in 2737 BCE. It is said that the emperor liked his drinking water boiled before he drank it so it would be clean, so that is what his servants did. One day, on a trip to a distant region, he and his army stopped to rest. A servant began boiling water for him to drink, and a dead  (tea) came into being.

The Erya, a Chinese dictionary dated to the 3rd century BCE, records that an infusion of some kind of leaf was used as early as the Zhou dynasty (1046–256 BCE).

While historically the origin of tea as a medicinal herb useful for staying awake is unclear, China is considered to have the earliest records of tea drinking, with recorded tea use in its history dating back to the first millennium BCE. The Han dynasty (206 BCE–220 CE) used tea as medicine. The use of tea as a beverage drunk for pleasure on social occasions dates from the Tang dynasty (618–907 CE) or earlier.

The Classic of Tea (《茶經》) by the Tang dynasty writer Lu Yu (陸羽; 729–804) is an early work on the subject. (See also Tea Classics) According to Cha Jing writing, around CE 760, tea drinking was widespread. The book describes how tea plants were grown, the leaves processed, and tea prepared as a beverage. It also describes how tea was evaluated. The book also discusses where the best tea leaves were produced.

At this time in tea's history, the nature of the beverage and style of tea preparation were quite different from the way westerners consume it today. Tea leaves were processed into compressed cakes form. The dried teacake, generally called brick tea was ground in a stone mortar. Hot water was added to the powdered teacake, or the powdered teacake was boiled in earthenware kettles then consumed as a hot beverage. See matcha for the Japanese version of using powdered green tea, which is derived from older Chinese customs.

A form of compressed tea referred to as white tea was being produced as far back as the Tang dynasty (618–907 CE). This special white tea of Tang was picked in early spring, when the tea bushes had abundant growths which resembled silver needles. These "first flushes" were used as the raw material to make the compressed tea. Tea is an important item in Chinese culture and is mentioned in the Seven necessities of (Chinese) daily life. Tea was also used as a relaxing therapy for the Chinese.

In 1753, Linnaeus described the plant as a single species, Thea sinensis. Later, however, he recognized two species, Thea Bohea and Thea viridis, as cultivated in China, and it was long thought that these were the origin of black and green tea respectively.

Roasting and brewing

Steaming tea leaves was the primary process used for centuries in the preparation of tea. After the transition from compressed tea, the production of tea for trade and distribution changed once again. The Chinese learned to process tea in a different way in the mid-13th century.

Back in the Tang Dynasty, tea was commonly prepared by bringing water to a boil and taking a cup of water out from the pot. Afterwards, the water would be stirred and tea powder would be poured into the swirling water. Finally, the water which was scooped out earlier was then poured back in which prevented the tea from over-boiling.

Fermentation
After cutting, tea is subjected to a so-called "fermentation." This process is not actually a fermentation, which is an anaerobic process, but rather an enzymatic oxidization of the polyphenols in the tea leaves, yielding theaflavins and thearubigins. When the tea leaves are dry, fermentation stops, allowing some control of the process by manipulation of the drying rate or adding water after drying. Fermentation can also be interrupted by heat, for example by steaming or dry-panning the tea leaves through a technique known as "shāqīng" (殺青) In 17th century China numerous advances were made in tea production. In the southern part of China, tea leaves were sun dried and then half fermented, producing Oolong or "black dragon tea." However, this method was not common in the rest of China.
Tea was used for medical purposes, and salt was often added to alter its bitter taste.

Tea in the Qing Dynasty in Relation to the Opium War 
Trade between China and Britain was dealt in favor of the Chinese. Tea, silk and porcelain remained desirable and high in demand for the British, but the Chinese did not find British goods as desirable and would only accept silver in payment for their goods, thus creating an imbalance. In order to reverse this situation, the British began smuggling opium into China, where they only accepted payments in silver as well. This created an endless cycle as Chinese citizens became addicted to opium, and the silver earned from opium sales would be used in turn by the British to pay for more Chinese goods as mentioned earlier, such as tea. It eventually led to the Opium wars, where Britain was victorious, and had allowed them to gain trading rights within China's borders as well as other concessions made by the Chinese.

Tea in mythology
Lu Yu wrote in the Classic of Tea or Cha Jing (茶经), "Tea as a beverage originated with Shennong."
The medicine book entitled Shennong Ben Cao Jing (神农本草经) stated that "Shennong tasted hundreds of herbs, he encountered seventy two poisons daily and used tea as an antidote"
In Chinese legend, Shennong died in Tea Hill (Chaling County), Hunan.

Origins of the tea plant in China
In 760 CE, Lu Yu already noted: Tea is a grand tree from the South, tall from one, two, and up to several dozen Chi. Some with circumference up two meters (6.6 feet).
A. Wilson in his exploration of the south east area of China discovered tea bushes up to ten feet tall in mountains in Sichuan
In 1939, botanists discovered a 7.5 meter (24.6 feet) wild tea tree in Wuchuang county of Guizhou province.
In 1940, on the Old Eagle mountain of Wuchuang county, a 6.6 meter (21.7 feet) tall wild tea tree was discovered.
In 1957, a 12-meter (39.4 feet) wild tea tree was discovered in Cheshui county of Guizhou.
In 1961, a one thousand seven hundred year old, thirty two meter (105 feet) tall and more than one meter (3.3 feet) wide wild tea tree was found in the rain forest of Yunnan. This is the king of tea trees.
In 1976, a 13-meter (42.3 feet) wild tea tree was found on Daozhen county, on a mountain at 1400 meter (4600 feet) elevation.
More wild tea trees were found in the mountains of Sichuan, Yunnan, and Guizhou provincies, many of them more than ten meters tall.

Etymology
 Tea was called 'tu' (荼) (in the Chinese ancient classic Shi Jing (The book of Songs)).
 Tea was also called 'jia' (檟) in the ancient Chinese classic Er Ya compiled during the early Han dynasty: " Jia is bitter tu". The word tu was further annotated by a Jin scholar, Guo Pu (276–324 CE): "Tu is a small plant, its leaves can be brewed into a beverage".
 Tea was also called "She' (蔎) in a West Han monograph on dialect: Fang Yian.
 During the Han dynasty, the word tu took on a new pronunciation, 'cha', in addition to its old pronunciation 'tu'.
The syllable 'tu' (荼) later developed into 'te' in the Fujian dialect, and later 'tea', 'te'.

The syllable 'she' (蔎) later became 'soh' in Jiangsu province, Suleiman's 'Sakh' also came from
'she'.

The syllable "jia' (檟) later became 'cha' and 'chai' (Russia, India).

During the Sui and Tang dynasties, drinking tea became a widespread custom, then spread west to Tibet.

The first use of the word 'cha' instead of 'tu' for tea was in Lu Yu's Cha Jing, The Classic of Tea of 760 CE.

Periods in the history of tea
 From prehistoric time to Spring and Autumn period (221 BCE) Tea was used as a sacrifice for ceremonies.
 According to the Chinese historical record, c. 1000 BCE, there were already tea farms in Sichuan and Yunnan.
 From the end of the Spring and Autumn period in the Early Western Han dynasty tea was used as a table vegetable food.
 In the historical text of "Yianzhi Chunchiu": the prime minister of Chi (547 BCE–490 BCE) had egg and tea as food on his table.
 Xia Zhong's Treatise on Food:: "Since Jin dynasty, the people of Wu (now Suzhou city) cooked tea leaves as food, and called it tea broth".
 From the beginning of Western Han to middle Western Han, tea was used as medicine.
 From the late Western Han dynasty to the Three Kingdoms period, tea was an imperial beverage.
 From the Western Jin dynasty to Sui dynasty, the use of tea as a beverage throughout the Chinese population
 From the Tang period onward, tea became one of the seven essentials of daily life
 During the Southern Song dynasty a Japanese monk 明菴栄西 Eisai (Yosai): came to Tiantai mountain of Zhejiang to study Chan (Zen) Buddhism (1168 CE); when he returned home in 1193 CE, he brought tea from China to Japan, planted it and wrote the first Japanese book on Tea:喫茶養生記, Treatise on Drinking Tea for Health. This was the beginning of tea cultivation and tea culture in Japan.
 In the Song dynasty, tea was a major export good, through the Silk Road on land and Silk Road on the sea, tea spread to Arab countries and Africa.
 Some historians believe Marco Polo encountered tea in his travel. Other historians point out that his writings fail to mention tea at all.
 In 1559, Giovanni ta Ramusio mentioned "chai" in "Delle Navigatione et Viaggi", Vol 6.
 1579, Two Russian travellers introduced Cha to Russian spy

Mass production of white tea
Modern-day white teas can be traced to the Qing dynasty in 1796. Back then, teas were processed and distributed as loose tea that was to be steeped, and they were produced from "chaicha", a mixed-variety tea bush. They differed from other China green teas in that the white tea process did not incorporate de-enzyming by steaming or pan-firing, and the leaves were shaped. The silver needle white teas that were produced from the "chaicha" tea bushes were thin, small and did not have much silvery-white hair.

It wasn't until 1885 that specific varietals of tea bushes were selected to make "Silver Needles" and other white teas. The large, fleshy buds of the "Big White", "Small White" and "Narcissus" tea bushes were selected to make white teas and are still used today as the raw material for the production of white tea. By 1891, the large, silvery-white down-covered Silver Needle was exported, and the production of White Peony started around 1922.

The first tea monograph
The first tea monograph Cha Jing by Tang dynasty writer Lu Yu was completed around 760 CE. This is more than four hundred years earlier than the first Japanese tea monograph by Eisai No known ancient Indian monograph on tea exists.

There were about one hundred tea monographs from the Tang dynasty to Qing dynasty. This treasure
about tea culture is only beginning to attract the interest of western scholars.

See also

 Chinese tea
 Economic history of China (1912–1949)
 Economic history of China (Pre-1911)
 Economy of China
 List of Chinese teas
 Lu Yu
 Tea Classics
 Tenfu Tea Museum

References

Citations

Sources 
 , "Origin of Tea"
 , "Tea, its history and mystery"
 , "Tea"
 , "The empire of tea: the remarkable history of the plant that took over the world"
 , "Tea: a global history"

Further reading 
 Lu, Yu. The Classic of Tea (《茶經》). 
 The Classic of Tea: Origins & Rituals Lu, Yu; Carpenter, Francis Ross; New York, U.S.A.: Ecco Press. 1995
 Forbes, Andrew; Henley, David (2011). China's Ancient Tea Horse Road. Chiang Mai: Cognoscenti Books. ASIN: B005DQV7Q2

External links
 Encyclopedia Americana, tea
History of tea, UK Tea Council
, tea and rhubarb
, map of tea growth in China
, tea in 1690

Chinese tea
Tea
China